Eleven Point State Park is one of three new Missouri state parks announced in 2016 that is awaiting developments and is unopened. The 4,167 acre state park is located mostly on lands of the historic Pigman Ranch near Riverton in Oregon County on Eleven Point River in the Ozarks of southern Missouri. Plans called for hiking and walking trails, camping, fishing, picnicking, birdwatching, and nature study to be available. In August 2017, the administration of Governor Eric Greitens closed the park indefinitely.

References

External links

Eleven Point State Park Missouri Department of Natural Resources

State parks of Missouri
2016 establishments in Missouri
Protected areas established in 2016
Protected areas of Oregon County, Missouri